Deferred income (also known as deferred revenue, unearned revenue, or unearned income) is, in accrual accounting, money received for goods or services which has not yet been earned. According to the revenue recognition principle, it is recorded as a liability until delivery is made, at which time it is converted into revenue.

For example, a company receives an annual software license fee paid out by a customer upfront on January 1. However, the company's fiscal year ends on May 31. So, the company using accrual accounting adds only five months' worth (5/12) of the fee to its revenues in profit and loss for the fiscal year the fee was received. The rest is added to deferred income (liability) on the balance sheet for that year.

A typical example is an annual maintenance contract where the entire contract is invoiced up front. “I received $12,000 for an annual maintenance contract, but need to recognize it as deferred income, and then recognize $1,000 each month as the service is rendered.”

Deferred income shares characteristics with accrued expense, with the difference that a liability to be covered later are goods or services received from a counterpart, while cash is to be paid out in a latter period, when such expense is incurred, the related expense item is recognized, and the same amount is deducted from accrued expenses. To put this more clearly, deferred income – the money that a company receives in advance – indicates the goods and services the company owes to its customers, while accrued expense indicates the money a company owes to others.

FASB defines definitive guidance on the revenue recognition for contract delivering companies. ASC 606 provides the latest revenue recognition guidance for such companies.

See also
 Deferrals in accounting
 Accruals in accounting
 Unearned income (Concept in economics)

References

Income statement